Koshkinsky District is an administrative and municipal district (raion), one of the twenty-seven in Samara Oblast, Russia. It is located in the north of the oblast. Its administrative center is the rural locality (a selo) of Koshki. Population: 24,194 (2010 Census);  The population of Koshki accounts for 32.9% of the district's total population.

References

Notes

Sources

Districts of Samara Oblast